Ştefania Iuliana Vătafu (born 12 July 1993) is a Romanian football midfielder currently playing for Anderlecht in Belgium's Super League Vrouwenvoetbal. She is a member of the Romanian national team.

Career
Vătafu earned her first call-up for the Romanian national team at age 16. She played in Romania's Liga I for a decade, first for Clujana and later for Olimpia Cluj, also playing regularly the UEFA Champions League in both, before moving to Spain's UD Granadilla in the 2017–18 winter transfer window.

International goals

References

External links 

1993 births
Living people
Romanian women's footballers
Romania women's international footballers
Women's association football midfielders
Expatriate women's footballers in Spain
Expatriate women's footballers in Belgium
Primera División (women) players
Romanian expatriate sportspeople in Spain
Romanian expatriate sportspeople in Belgium
Romanian expatriate footballers
RSC Anderlecht (women) players
Super League Vrouwenvoetbal players
UD Granadilla Tenerife players
FCU Olimpia Cluj players
CFF Clujana players